Pir-piai or Pirpiai is a town in the District of Nowshera in Khyber-Pakhtunkhwa, Pakistan. Its population is around 35,000. 
Pirpiai has a high literacy rate of 92%, compared with Pakistan's average literacy rate of 55%. The village is on GT Road, 8 km from Nowshera Cantonment towards Peshawar. Most of the villagers are working-folk, adding to the work-pool through government service, and self-employment. Substantial number of people from the village are working abroad and adding to national exchequer. The village is rich in producing educated and professional class like engineers, doctors, officers of armed forces, civil servants, professors and so on.

History

Pirpiai is said to have been named after Pir Muhammad Khan of Pirpiai. Pir muhammad khan an Afghan who migrated from Afghanistan and settled in the area. History says that  Pir Muhammad Khan was the son of  Daulat Khan. Daulat Khan was a commander and confidant of Nadir Shah Afshar, the ruler of Iran.

Nadir Shah Afshar, having defeated the Pushtun Hotaki ruler Mir Hussain Hotaki in Herat and Ghazni in 1738, attempted to invade India. After his defeat, Mir Hussain Hotaki agreed to send Pushtun forces with the army of Nadir Shah. There were 12,000 Abdali (Durrani) and 4,000 Pushtun Khilji soldiers in this army. A hamlet of the Dalazak tribe was on the south bank of the Kabul River near present-day Pirpiai. The area along the river was forested at that time. When the Shah's forces reached this area they asked the Dalazak tribe to join their army, but they refused. Nadir Shah then ordered his army to destroy and burn the village, causing the Dalazaks to flee from the area. Nadir Shah awarded the area to  Daulat Khan, his confidant.  Daulat Khan belonged to the Gumoriani also known as the Zmaryani tribe, which is a branch of the Kasi (Pashtun tribe).  Daulat Khan rebuilt the village, but it was later destroyed by flood of River Kabul. Pir Muhammad Khan moved some two and a half miles south and settled with family.

According to the Tareekh-e-Peshawar by Rai Bahadur Munshi Gopal Das, in 1874 there were 52 Hindus and 1502 Muslims living in the village.

Originally Pirpiai acted as a merchant town for passing travelers. It is situated beside the original Sher Shah Suri's Highway, known in modern times as the Grand Trunk Road. The Mughals and their armies often used this route.  Men from the village were recruited by the passing armies. Bahadur Baba was a famous soldier recruited at that time, an older man who fought fiercely and with great skill. When he died fighting for the Mughal armies, the Mughal Emperor sent him back to be buried in his native village of Pirpiai, Baba's last wish.

Education, health and recreation 
Besides many private educational institutions from primary to Intermediate, the village has six Government Primary Schools and three High Schools for both girls and boys. The village owns two Boys Colleges and one Girls College.

Basic healthcare and medical facilities are available 24/7, both at private clinics and at Government hospitals closer to village. CMH and other Govt hospitals are within reach of the village.

Cricket, Soccer, Volleyball and Badminton are popular sports in Pirpiai. The village has a  park with lakes 1 km away on the Grand Trunk Road.

Miscellany
Pirpiai, for so long, was known as Small England (chotta wilayat) due to its high rate of literacy and development. The village is divided into smaller sectors known as "Mohallah", a few of which are: Miskeen Khail, Qamar khail, Baba Khail, Sadri Khail, Tapu Khail, Jan abad, Babar, New Miskeen Khail, Zar Muhammad Khail, Mandoori etc. Pirpiai has more than 35 mosques within its own Mohallahs. Each Mohallah has at least two mosques.

The village has a bank, a post office, a railway station and a sanctioned dry port. Facilities such as electricity, gas, water, sewage, landline telephone, and internet are available along with cellular mobile phone services. All five mobile operators of Pakistan have their towers installed in the village. Notable British generals including General Sir Douglas Gracey, Sir George Roos-Keppel are said to have visited the village, invited by one of the known villager named Col. Mir Haider Khan  78 people from Pirpiai took part in the First World War as soldiers in the Indian Army. Pirpiai is one of the few villages in Pakistan that has an official plaque commemorating its First World War contribution.

References

Populated places in Nowshera District